Pygobunus is a genus of harvestmen in the family Sclerosomatidae from Japan.

Species
 Pygobunus formosanus Roewer, 1957
 Pygobunus okadai N. Tsurusaki, 1983

References

Harvestmen
Harvestman genera